Howard Avedis born Hikmet Labib Avedis; (May 25, 1927 – October 25, 2017) was a film director, producer and author

Background
Avedis lived in Southern California with his wife Marlene.

As a film student, he studied at the University of Southern California and won the George Cukor Award.

As of 2014, he was working on his second novel. His first publication was Hotel Paradise: Nothing Is As It Seems.

Film work
His early work as a director included The Stepmother in 1972, a film that starred Alejandro Rey. In 1974, he directed and produced The Teacher, shot in 12 days all around Los Angeles, on a budget of $65,000 using the investor producers home, her boat and clever use of the industrial abandoned (used mostly for location shooting ) industrial manufacturing section in east L.A., a film that starred Angel Tompkins, Jay North and Anthony James. in 1975, he produced and directed The Fifth Floor, a film about a young lady who gets sent to the psych ward called "The Filth Floor". It starred Dianne Hull and Bo Hopkins.<ref>Reading Eagle April 30, 1980 Page 44, 'Fifth Floor' You' Have To Be Nuts To See This Movie By Jennifer J. Hollingshead</ref> Other films he has produced or directed include Mortuary, Separate Ways and They're Playing with Fire. Crown International released the film and The Teacher has remained a popular cult film to this day.

In 2007, his film The Teacher paired with The Pick Up and released on a DVD titled "Welcome to the Grindhouse: Two Sinful Shockers". In May 2012, his 1983 horror film Mortuary was transferred to DVD, with special features included, in HD mastered from the original Inter-Negative. It was released by Scorpio Releasing in conjunction with Camelot Entertainment.

Filmography

As Howard Avedis
 Kidnapped (1987) 
 They're Playing with Fire (1984)
 Mortuary (1983) 
 Separate Ways (1981) 
 The Fifth Floor (1978)

As Hikmet Avedis
 Texas Detour (1978)
 Scorchy (1976)
 Dr. Minx (1975)
 The Specialist (1975)
 The Teacher (1974)

As Hikmet L. Avedis
 The Stepmother (1972)Imdb Howard Avedis

Books
 Hotel Paradise'' – (2014) , 9781493575664

References

1927 births
2017 deaths
USC School of Cinematic Arts alumni
American film directors
American people of Iraqi descent
Iraqi emigrants to the United States